Hujan is a Malaysian indie rock band formed in Kuala Lumpur, in 2005. It was founded by vocalist Noh Salleh and lead guitarist AG Coco. Fans of Hujan are dubbed as  Raingers, as the band's name translates to rain in Malay. Despite the lack of love from certain quarters at early stage of the band, Hujan has had some of the most successful breakthrough music in Malaysia.

In its early years, Hujan established itself as part of the Malaysian independent music scene, starting on the social media Myspace. Their first two EPs circulated around, namely 1, 2, 3, Go! (2007) and Check Check Rock Rock (2007) released by independent record label Noh Phrofile Enterprise. They developed a sound that is unorthodox and uniquely stylistic within Malaysian music, often between combinations of alternative rock and jazz melodies. Hujan found unexpected mainstream success and strength of radio airplay with Pagi Yang Gelap, a single from their EP 1, 2, 3, Go! (2007). It was received with popularity on indie radio stations such as XFM. Another popular single, from their debut self-titled album Hujan (2008), Bila Aku Sudah Tiada received many nominations, and most notably won at Anugerah Muzik Malaysia or AIM in 2009 as the Lagu Terbaik or Best Song. They have released six studio albums, as well as one live album Live at Planet Hollywood (2009).

Noh Hujan, the frontman of Hujan, has released his own music projects under his real name Noh Salleh, with notable albums such as Angin Kencang.

As of 11 April 2020, Hujan has released their entire discography, including their acclaimed self-titled "Hujan" album onto most major music streaming services, including Spotify and Apple Music.

History 

It all started in 2005, when Noh Salleh uploaded a few demos as a personal solo project onto then popular social media platform Myspace. AG Coco, who at the time was a music student, contacted Noh to perform his songs as study material. Hujan's main goal was to be a jazz band, but after end up being rock band with mixture of jazz elements. Noh Salleh and Hang Dimas played their first gig on 17 February 2006 at Malam Pesta Gagalis Ubu in Lost Generation Space as Hujan. The band released their first two EP 1, 2, 3, Go! and Check Check Rock Rock both in 2007. Subsequently, after the releases, Hujan quickly turned into a musical phenomenon, and went on to win Best Rock Album and Best Rock Song categories on Anugerah Industri Muzik in 2009.

In an unfortunate incident in 2008 at Johor, the band were victims of an elaborate set-up by promoter with malicious intent to humiliate and blatantly bully the band members. When they played their first song on set 'Aku Scandal' they were met by a barrage of insults by the crowd, which had bad blood with the band due to the fact that they were too 'mainstream'. The crowd continuously chanted 'mainstream' and the show was promptly ended by Hujan after completing the first song. The incident can be seen on YouTube.

In September 2009, Noh Salleh invited Izzat Uzaini to join Hujan through a text message, who was looking for a new bassist for Mencari Konklusi Tour.

Band members 

Current members
 Noh Salleh – vocals, rhythm guitar (2005–present)
 AG Coco – lead guitar, producer (2005–present)
 Azham Ahmad – drums (2005–present)
 Izzat Uzaini – bass (2009–present)

Former members
 Hang Dimas – keyboard
 Azhar Imran "Jaja" – bass
 Nazeri Nazirul "Dukegong" – bass

Timeline

Discography 

Studio albums
 Hujan (2008)
 Mencari Konklusi (2009)
 Lonely Soldier Boy (2010)
 Sang Enemy (2012)
 Jika Sempat (2016)

EP
 1, 2, 3, Go! (2007)
 Check Check Rock Rock (2007)
 Hujan UK Release (2008)
 Suria (2018)
 Pelangi & Kau (2020)

Original soundtrack
 Jiwa Kelajuan (OST Impak Maksima)
 Bahgia (OST Kisah Cinta)

Compilations
 CD Issue-9 Majalah JUNK: Pagi Yang Gelap
 Support Our Local Act Volume 1: Bila Aku Sudah Tiada

Concert tours 

 Kugiran Hujan Ke United Kingdom (2007)
 Check Check Rock Rock Tour Hujan (2007)
 Mencari Konklusi Tour (2009)
 Hujan & Search Europe Tour (2011)
 Sang Enemy Worldwide Transgression Tour (Hujan X Love Me Butch) (2013)
 Abstrax X Hujan London Tour (2016)

Awards and nominations

Anugerah Industri Muzik

Anugerah Planet Muzik

Anugerah Juara Lagu

Anugerah Bintang Popular Berita Harian

Anugerah Shout!

Versus TV9

References

External links 

Malaysian indie rock groups
Malaysian alternative rock groups
Musical groups established in 2005